Westside Community Schools, also known locally as District 66, is the third largest school district in Omaha, Nebraska, United States. The district has one high school, one middle school, ten elementary schools, and one alternative high school. The district is in the center-west part of Omaha, between the Omaha Public Schools district and the Millard Public Schools district. Westside also has over 2,000 "opt-in" students, with most coming from OPS.

History
In 1946, residents of four rural school districts located in what was then farming areas to the west of Omaha began holding discussions about combining resources, which led to a proposal to merge the four districts. In 1947, three of the districts -- Districts 31, 46 and 65 -- agreed to merge to create District 66. A junior-senior high school for the district was founded in 1952 where Westside High School is located today.

Recent events
The high school, Westside High School, has purchased about 2,000 MacBook computers in the "1:1 Initiative". Each high school student is issued one at the beginning of the year. They are used by students throughout the school year, and then returned at the end of this time. The intent of the initiative was to offer each student the same technological opportunities. Westside Middle School followed in the footsteps of the high school and bought about 1,000 computers for the 7th and 8th graders, with the same rules and constraints as the high school students. Elementary school students also have access to MacBook computers, as well as iPads. 

In 2012, the board of education announced that Dr. Blane McCann had been selected as superintendent.

In 2021 the school issued an apology after their "quote of the day" program included a saying by Adolf Hitler.

Schools
Westside High School
Westside Middle School
Hillside Elementary
Loveland Elementary
Oakdale Elementary
Paddock Road Elementary
Prairie Lane Elementary
Rockbrook Elementary
Sunset Hills Elementary
Swanson Elementary
Westbrook Elementary
Westgate Elementary

See also 
 Education in Omaha, Nebraska
 Westside School District v. Mergens

References

External links

Westside Community Schools Website

Schools in Omaha, Nebraska
School districts in Nebraska
School districts of Omaha, Nebraska